Lincoln Park is an urban park in Chicago, which gave its name to the Lincoln Park, Chicago community area.

Lincoln Park may also refer to:

Parks

Urban parks
Lincoln Park (Los Angeles), California
Lincoln Park (San Francisco), California
Lincoln Park (Washington, D.C.)
Lincoln Park (Portland, Maine)
Lincoln Park (Jersey City), New Jersey
Lincoln Park (Albany), New York
Lincoln Park (Cincinnati), Ohio
Lincoln Park (Marion, Ohio)
Lincoln Park (Youngstown, Ohio)
Lincoln Park (Seattle), Washington

Amusement parks
Lincoln Park (Dartmouth, Massachusetts), a former amusement park
Lincoln Park (New Orleans), Louisiana, a former amusement park

Communities
Lincoln Park, Colorado, a census-designated place
Lincoln Park, Georgia, a census-designated place
Lincoln Park, Michigan, a city
Lincoln Park, New Jersey, a borough
Lincoln Park Airport
Lincoln Park, New York, a hamlet
Lincoln Park, Pennsylvania, an unincorporated community
Lincoln Park, Texas, a town

Neighborhoods

Canada
Lincoln Park, Calgary, Alberta

United States
Lincoln Park, San Diego, California
Lincoln Park, Denver, Colorado
Lincoln Park, Chicago, Illinois
Lincoln Park, Rockville, Maryland
Lincoln Park (Duluth), Minnesota
Lincoln Park, Edison, New Jersey
Lincoln Park/West Bergen, Jersey City, New Jersey
Lincoln Park, Newark, New Jersey
Lincoln Park, New Brunswick, New Jersey
Lincoln Park, Syracuse, New York
Lincoln Park Historic District (Pomona, California)
Lincoln Park Historic District (Rocky Mount, North Carolina)

Schools
Lincoln Park Academy, Ft. Pierce, Florida
Lincoln Park High School (Chicago, Illinois)
Lincoln Park High School (Lincoln Park, Michigan)
Lincoln Park Performing Arts Charter School, Midland, Pennsylvania

See also 
Lincoln Park Zoo in Chicago
Lincoln Park Zoo (Manitowoc), Wisconsin
Lincoln National Park in South Australia
Lincoln Greyhound Park, now Twin River Casino in Lincoln, Rhode Island
Linkin Park, American Nu metal/rock band